Les Riceys is a commune in the Aube department in north-central France. It is situated in an important viticultural area, and in particular is known for Rosé des Riceys wine.

With its 866 ha of vines, it is the commune that has the largest wine-growing area in all of Champagne.

Population

See also
Communes of the Aube department

References

Communes of Aube
Aube communes articles needing translation from French Wikipedia